The mixed team badminton event at the 2017 Summer Universiade was held from August 23 to 25 at the Taipei Gymnasium in Taipei, Taiwan.

Group composition

Group stage

Group A 

|-

|-

|-

|}

South Korea vs Sri Lanka

South Korea vs Uganda

Sri Lanka vs Uganda

Group B 

|-

|-

|-

|}

Japan vs Poland

Japan vs Bhutan

Poland vs Bhutan

Group C 

|-

|-

|-

|-

|-

|-

|}

Germany vs Canada

Germany vs Estonia

Canada vs Estonia

Philippines vs Germany

Philippines vs Canada

Philippines vs Estonia

Group D 

|-

|-

|-

|}

Malaysia vs Australia

Malaysia vs South Africa

Australia vs South Africa

Group E 

|-

|-

|-

|}

Thailand vs Indonesia

Thailand vs Singapore

Indonesia vs Singapore

Group F 

|-

|-

|-

|-

|-

|-

|}

India vs Hong Kong

India vs Slovenia

Hong Kong vs Slovenia

Sweden vs India

Sweden vs Hong Kong

Sweden vs Slovenia

Group G 

|-

|-

|-

|}

Russia vs United States

Russia vs Botswana

United States vs Botswana 

RET: Retired.

Group H 

|-

|-

|-

|}

Chinese Taipei vs France

Chinese Taipei vs Brazil

France vs Brazil

Ranking Stage

Top 8

Quarterfinals

Semifinals

Final

9th–16th places

9th–16th places

9th–12th places

9th place

17th - 23rd places

17th - 23rd places

17th–20th places

17th place

24th place

Final ranking

References

Mixed Team
Universiade